Diego Felipe Andrés Orellana Medina (born 16 May 1993) is a Chilean footballer who plays for Deportes Antofagasta.

References

External link

1993 births
Living people
Chilean footballers
Chilean Primera División players
Everton de Viña del Mar footballers
Puerto Montt footballers
Unión La Calera footballers
Deportes Iquique footballers
C.D. Antofagasta footballers
Association football midfielders